

Matches
Scores and results list England's points tally first.

References

England national rugby union team tours of Australia
England
Tour